

This is a list of the National Register of Historic Places listings in Santa Fe County, New Mexico.

This is intended to be a complete list of the properties and districts on the National Register of Historic Places in Santa Fe County, New Mexico, United States. Latitude and longitude coordinates are provided for many National Register properties and districts; these locations may be seen together in a map.

There are 95 properties and districts listed on the National Register in the county, including 8 National Historic Landmarks.

Current listings

|}

See also

 List of National Historic Landmarks in New Mexico
 National Register of Historic Places listings in New Mexico

Notes
A. While the NRIS lists the tower as being in San Miguel County, the map included with its nomination places it within Santa Fe County.

References

 
Santa Fe
Northern Rio Grande National Heritage Area